These are the results of the 2018 Asian Wrestling Championships which took place between 27 February and 4 March 2018 in Bishkek, Kyrgyzstan.

Men's freestyle

57 kg
3 March

61 kg
4 March

65 kg
3 March

70 kg
3 March

74 kg
4 March

79 kg
3 March

86 kg
4 March

92 kg
4 March

97 kg
3 March

 Aibek Usupov of Kyrgyzstan originally finished fifth, but was disqualified after he refused the doping test.

125 kg
4 March

Men's Greco-Roman

55 kg
27 February

60 kg
28 February

63 kg
27 February

67 kg
28 February

72 kg
28 February

77 kg
27 February

82 kg
28 February

87 kg
27 February

 Husham Majeed of Iraq originally finished fifth, but was disqualified after he tested positive for Testosterone.

97 kg
28 February

 Mostafa Salehizadeh of Iran originally won the gold medal, but was disqualified after he tested positive for Stanozolol. Rustam Assakalov was upgraded to the gold medal, Yerulan Iskakov to the silver medal and Ali Majeed was raised to third and took the bronze medal.

130 kg
27 February

Women's freestyle

50 kg
1 March

53 kg
2 March

55 kg
1 March

57 kg
2 March

59 kg
1 March

62 kg
2 March

65 kg
2 March

68 kg
1 March

72 kg
2 March

76 kg
1 March

References

External links
Official website

2018 Results